Mahajerin Estij (also Romanized as Mahājerīn Estīj) is a village in Qaleh Rural District, in the Central District of Manujan County, Kerman Province, Iran. At the 2006 census, its population was 251, in 46 families.

References 

Populated places in Manujan County